Yonatan Levi (born 2 January 1998) is an Israeli professional footballer who currently plays for Hapoel Kfar Saba.

Club career

Maccabi Haifa
A product of Hapoel Asi Gilboa and Maccabi Haifa's youth system, Levi began his career in the youth teams of Maccabi Haifa. In 2017, he joined Maccabi Haifa's senior team and made his Israeli Premier League debut on May 13, 2017, in a 2–1 loss against Hapoel Be'er Sheva in the 2016 Ligat Ha'al Toto Cup. Levi would be later loaned out to Hapoel Hadera.

Hapoel Hadera
On Sep 2, 2018, Yonatan Levi was loaned out to Hapoel Hadera from Maccabi Haifa until Feb 3, 2019.
After 6 appearances for Hapoel Hadera, Levi scored his first league goal and game winner against Sektzia Ness Ziona on Dec 21, 2018 in a 1–0 victory in the second round of the State Cup of Israel (Gvia HaMedina).

Sektzia Ness Ziona
Levi was later loaned to Sektzia Ness Ziona where he started regularly and played as a left and center back. Levi received his first league red card by yellow card accumulation in the 89th minute of a 1–1 tie against Hapoel Tel Aviv.

Hapoel Iksal
After his loan to Sektzia Ness Ziona expired in February 2020 Levi was then loaned to Hapoel Iksal until June 30 of 2021 where he currently plays as a defender.

Hapoel Kfar Saba
On October 11, 2021, Levi signed with Hapoel Kfar Saba as a free agent, making his debut in a substitution appearance 4 days later in a regular season match against F.C. Kafr Qasim that ended in a 2–2 draw.

Club career statistics

References

External links
 

1998 births
Living people
Israeli footballers
Maccabi Haifa F.C. players
Hapoel Hadera F.C. players
Hapoel Nof HaGalil F.C. players
Sektzia Ness Ziona F.C. players
Hapoel Iksal F.C. players
Hapoel Kfar Saba F.C. players
Israeli Premier League players
Liga Leumit players
Footballers from Northern District (Israel)
Association football forwards